Al-Sadeq Sport Club, is an Iraqi football team based in Al-Imam Al-Sadeq district, Basra, that plays in Iraq Division Two.

Managerial history
  Aqeel Al-Shaheen

See also
 2019–20 Iraq FA Cup
 2021–22 Iraq FA Cup

References

External links
 Al-Sadeq SC on Goalzz.com
 Iraq Clubs- Foundation Dates
 Basra Clubs Union

Football clubs in Iraq
2004 establishments in Iraq
Association football clubs established in 2004
Football clubs in Basra
Basra